Alexander A. Borbély (born 1939 in Budapest) is a Hungarian-Swiss pharmacologist known for his sleep research.

Borbély proposed the two-process model of sleep regulation in 1982 which postulates there are two complementary processes (S and C, which stands for Sleep and Circadian, respectively) which together account for one's sleep schedule. This model has been widely influential and strongly influenced the field of circadian neuroscience for decades.

References 

Hungarian pharmacologists
Swiss pharmacologists
Scientists from Budapest
1939 births
Living people